Cycle is an unincorporated community in Yadkin County, North Carolina, United States.

History
A post office called Cycle was established in 1904, and remained in operation until 1972. The origin of the name "Cycle" is obscure.

References

Unincorporated communities in Yadkin County, North Carolina
Unincorporated communities in North Carolina

Cycle: community in w. Yadkin County on Dobbins Creek.  Known first as Pea Ridge.  Post office est. about 1913 and named Cycle from the fact that the patrons it served lived in a circle from the post office.  Post office name gradually replaced the older name.  (The North Carolina Gazetteer by William S. Powell)